Blanche of Lancaster (25 March 1342 – 12 September 1368) was a member of the English royal House of Plantagenet and the daughter of the kingdom's wealthiest and most powerful peer, Henry of Grosmont, 1st Duke of Lancaster. She was the first wife of John of Gaunt, the mother of King Henry IV, and the grandmother of King Henry V of England.

Lineage
Blanche was born on 25 March 1342, according to her father's inquisitions post mortem. She is also said to have been born as late as 1347, but this has been called into question as that would mean she had her first child at only about age 13.

She was the younger daughter of Henry of Grosmont, 1st Duke of Lancaster, and his wife Isabel de Beaumont.  She and her elder sister Maud, Countess of Leicester, were born at Bolingbroke Castle in Lindsey. Maud married Ralph de Stafford and then William I, Duke of Bavaria. Since Maud left no surviving children upon her death, her younger sister inherited the entirety of her father's titles and very considerable estates.

Marriage

On 19 May 1359, at Reading Abbey, Reading, Berkshire, Blanche married her third cousin, John of Gaunt, third son of King Edward III. The whole royal family was present at the wedding, and the King gave Blanche expensive gifts of jewellery. 

The title Duke of Lancaster became extinct upon her father's death without male heirs in 1361. However, as he was married to Blanche, John of Gaunt became Earl of Lancaster, Earl of Derby, Earl of Lincoln and Earl of Leicester, although he did not receive all of these titles until the death of Blanche's older sister, Maud, in 1362. The Duchy of Lancaster (second creation) was later bestowed on Gaunt. The influence associated with the titles would lead him to become Lord High Steward. 

Jean Froissart described Blanche (following her death) as "jone et jolie" ("young and pretty"). Geoffrey Chaucer described "White" (the central figure in his Book of the Duchess, believed to have been inspired by Blanche: see below) in such terms as "rody, fresh, and lyvely hewed", her neck as "whyt, smothe, streght, and flat", and her throat as "a round tour of yvoire": she was "bothe fair and bright", and Nature's "cheef patron [pattern] of beautee".

Gaunt and Blanche's marriage is widely believed to have been happy, although there is little solid evidence for this. The assumption seems to be based on the fact that Gaunt chose to be buried with Blanche, despite his two subsequent marriages, and on the themes of love, devotion and grief expressed in Chaucer's poem (see below)a rather circular argument, as it is partly on the basis of these themes that the couple's relationship is identified as the inspiration for the poem. Blanche and Gaunt had seven children, three of whom survived infancy.

Death and commemoration
Blanche died at Tutbury Castle, Staffordshire, on 12 September 1368 while her husband was overseas. Froissart reported that she died aged about 22.

It is believed that she may have died after contracting the Black Death, which was rife in Europe at that time. Her funeral at St. Paul's Cathedral in London was preceded by a magnificent cortege attended by most of the upper nobility and clergy. John of Gaunt held annual commemorations of her death for the rest of his life and established a joint chantry foundation on his own death. 

In 1373, Jean Froissart wrote a long poem, Le Joli Buisson de Jonece, commemorating both Blanche and Philippa of Hainault (Gaunt's mother, who had died in 1369).

It may have been for one of the anniversary commemorations of Blanche's death that Geoffrey Chaucer, then a young squire and mostly unknown writer of court poetry, was commissioned to write what became The Book of the Duchess in her honour. Though Chaucer's intentions can never be defined with absolute certainty, many believe that at least one of the aims of the poem was to make John of Gaunt see that his grief for his late wife had become excessive, and to prompt him to try to overcome it. The poem tells the story of the poet's dream. Wandering a wood, the poet discovers a knight clothed in black, and inquires of the knight's sorrow. The knight, perhaps representing Gaunt, is mourning a terrible tragedy, which may mirror Gaunt's own extended mourning for Blanche.

In 1374, six years after her death, John of Gaunt commissioned a double tomb for himself and Blanche from the mason Henry Yevele. The magnificent monument in the choir of St Paul's was completed by Yevele in 1380, with the assistance of Thomas Wrek, having cost a total of £592. Gaunt himself died in 1399, and was laid to rest beside Blanche. The two effigies were notable for having their right hands joined. An adjacent chantry chapel was added between 1399 and 1403.

Issue
Blanche and John of Gaunt together had seven children, of whom three survived to adulthood:

 Philippa of Lancaster (31 March 1360 – 19 July 1415), wife of John I of Portugal.
 John of Lancaster (c.1362/1364); died in early infancy.
 Elizabeth of Lancaster (21 February 1363 – 24 November 1426); married firstly John Hastings, 3rd Earl of Pembroke, secondly to John Holland, 1st Duke of Exeter, thirdly to John Cornwall, 1st Baron Fanhope.
 Edward of Lancaster (1365–1365).
 John of Lancaster (4 May 1366); died in early infancy.
 Henry IV of England (15 April 1367 – 20 March 1413); married firstly Mary de Bohun and secondly Joanna of Navarre.
 Isabel of Lancaster (b.1368); died young.

Ancestry

References

1342 births
1368 deaths
14th-century deaths from plague (disease)
14th-century English nobility
14th-century English women
Burials at St Paul's Cathedral
Daughters of English dukes
Lancaster
Lancaster
House of Lancaster
Earls of Lancaster